Isabel Jean Jones was an English-born South African consumer journalist, best known for her consumer rights programme Fair Deal. She died in Johannesburg on 11 March 2008, after being admitted to the hospital on 7 March 2008. She had previously been admitted to hospital in December 2007, where she had undergone open heart surgery.

Biography
Jones was born in London, but she lived in South Africa for 20 years.

In 2007, she won the dti Award for Consumer Champions.

Death
Jones died in hospital on 11 March 2008, after being admitted to hospital on 7 March 2008. Her funeral was held on International Consumer Day, on 15 March 2008.

References

Other references
https://web.archive.org/web/20071014205447/http://www.famousfaces.co.za/masterfile/i_jones.html

South African women journalists
White South African people
Year of birth missing
2008 deaths